Chris Jean Tamas Jacques Hackel (born 15 December 1987) is a Mauritian swimmer. Hackel represented Mauritius at the 2004 Summer Olympics and 2006 Commonwealth Games.

2004 Summer Olympics
Hackel competed in the Men's 50 metre freestyle and won his individual heat, but finished 62nd overall out of 86 competitors.

2006 Commonwealth Games
Hackel competed in 3 different events at the 2006 Commonwealth Games, 100 metres freestyle, 200 metres freestyle, and 400 metres freestyle.

External links
 
 Info Yahoo! Sports

1987 births
Living people
Mauritian male freestyle swimmers
Swimmers at the 2004 Summer Olympics
Olympic swimmers of Mauritius
Swimmers at the 2006 Commonwealth Games
Commonwealth Games competitors for Mauritius